The 1995–96 Utah Utes men's basketball team represented the University of Utah as a member of the Western Athletic Conference during the 1995–96 men's basketball season. Led by head coach Rick Majerus, the Utes made a run to the Sweet Sixteen of the NCAA tournament. The team finished with an overall record of 27–7 (15–3 WAC).

Roster

Schedule and results

|-
!colspan=9 style=| Non-conference regular season

|-
!colspan=9 style=| WAC regular season

|-
!colspan=9 style=| WAC Tournament

|-
!colspan=9 style=| NCAA Tournament

Rankings

Awards and honors
Keith Van Horn – Consensus Second-team All-American, WAC Player of the Year (2x)

References

Utah Utes men's basketball seasons
Utah
Utah
Utah Utes
Utah Utes